In computing, Russification involves the localization of computers and software, allowing the user interface of a computer and its software to communicate in the Russian language using Cyrillic script.

Problems associated with Russification before the advent of Unicode included the absence of a single  character-encoding standard for Cyrillic (see Cyrillic script#Computer encoding).

History of the MS-DOS Russification
In Microsoft, the Russification project manager and one of its main developers was Nikolai Lyubovny (Николай Любовный). Based on an initiative of Microsoft Germany in March 1991, derivates of the Russian MS-DOS 5.0 drivers used for keyboard, display and printer localization support (DISPLAY.SYS, EGA.CPI, EGA2.CPI, KEYB.COM, KEYBOARD.SYS, MSPRINT.SYS, COUNTRY.SYS, ALPHA.EXE) could also be purchased separately (with English messages) as part of Microsoft's AlphabetPlus kit. This enabled English issues of MS-DOS 3.3, 4.01 and 5.0 to be set up for Eastern European countries like Czechoslovakia, Poland, Hungary, Yugoslavia, Romania and Bulgaria.

Russification of Microsoft Windows
A comprehensive instruction set for computer Russification is maintained by Paul Gorodyansky. It is mirrored in many places and recommended by the U.S. Library of Congress.

See also
 Cyrillization
 GOST 10859
 Romanization of Russian
 АДОС, unrelated to Russian MS-DOS
 PTS-DOS
 Mojibake

References

External links
 Modern Online (Virtual) Keyboard for Russian (not just alphabet order)
 Online Keyboard for Russian
 Virtual Russian Online Keyboard with Spellcheck

User interfaces
Russian language
Russification
 
Computing in the Soviet Union